The following roads are numbered 3A:

Canada
 Alberta Highway 3A
 British Columbia Highway 3A
 Manitoba Highway 3A
 Newfoundland and Labrador Route 3A (Team Gushue Highway)
 Nova Scotia Trunk 3A (former)

United States
 Massachusetts Route 3A
 Nevada State Route 3A (former)
 New Hampshire Route 3A
 New York State Route 3A
 Oklahoma State Highway 3A
 Texas Park Road 3A

Territories
 Guam Highway 3A